Victor Charles Brown (26 July 1903 – 1971) was an English professional football right back who played in the Football League for Coventry City and Leeds United. After his retirement as a player, he coached at Coventry City.

Career statistics

References 

English Football League players
Association football fullbacks
1903 births
1971 deaths
Sportspeople from Bedford
Bedford Town F.C. players
Leeds United F.C. players
Coventry City F.C. players
Chester City F.C. players
Wrexham F.C. wartime guest players
New Brighton A.F.C. wartime guest players
HFC Haarlem players
English expatriate footballers
Expatriate footballers in the Netherlands
English expatriate sportspeople in the Netherlands
English footballers
Footballers from Bedfordshire